Séguéla Airport  is an airport serving Séguéla, a town in Côte d'Ivoire. The airport has one runway measuring  that will be asphalted.

Infrastructure
Séguéla Airport has one runway with dimensions . During a July 2015 press conference in Séguéla, President Alassane Ouattara said that the runway would be asphalted by 2020 at a cost of 7 billion West African CFA francs.

See also

Transport in Côte d'Ivoire

References

External links

Airports in Ivory Coast
Buildings and structures in Woroba District
Worodougou